The National Police Air Service (NPAS) is a police aviation service that provides centralised air support to the 43
territorial police forces in England and Wales, as well as the three special police forces serving that area. It replaced the previous structure whereby police forces operated their own helicopters, either individually or in small consortia (such as the South East Air Support Unit). The project was coordinated by Alex Marshall (the then Chief Constable of Hampshire Police). West Yorkshire Police is the lead force, and the service is coordinated from the NPAS Operations Centre, at Wakefield, West Yorkshire.

History

Rollout
NPAS became operational on 1 October 2012, and was rolled out across England and Wales in stages. The service provides 19 helicopters and four fixed wing aircraft, operating from 15 bases.

NPAS suggested that the Police Scotland Air Support Unit join the service to reduce costs. However that did not materialise.

Base closures 
In February 2015, it was announced that, due to a 14% cut in revenue over the following three years, NPAS would be closing ten bases over two years.

Fixed wing operations 
In response to slashed budgets, NPAS investigated the use of fixed wing aircraft, which are cheaper to fly and maintain. A new aeroplane base was created at Doncaster Airport, housing four fixed wing Vulcanair P68R aircraft. This became operational in early 2020.
, the aircraft had been deployed 1,564 times.

In November 2022, shortly after the closure of Doncaster Sheffield Airport, NPAS announced that the fixed wing fleet would temporarily relocate to Leeds Bradford Airport.

Criticism
There was some initial criticism from forces around the service provided by NPAS when it began operation. This was primarily due to the reduction in number of bases and aircraft available, following general cuts by the UK Home Office to police funding. This led to Her Majesty's Inspectorate of Constabulary and Fire & Rescue Services (HMICFRS) conducting a case study of NPAS with its conclusions made public on 30 November 2017.  The report commented at some length on the governance and funding of the service provided. The report specifically stated that there was no criticism of NPAS staff or its operational delivery. HMICFRS included the following observation in its press release:

Fleet

 Eurocopter EC135 (Airbus H135) - 15
 One additional H135, formerly on long-term lease with the Norwegian Police Service, now serves exclusively as a training helicopter for new tactical flight officers
 Airbus Helicopters H145 - four
 Vulcanair P68R - four

Map of NPAS bases

See also
Police aviation in the United Kingdom
Law enforcement in the United Kingdom
Police aviation

References

External links